Nauwalde is a village and a former municipality in the district of Meißen, in Saxony, Germany. Since 1 January 2013, it is part of the town Gröditz.

The following villages belong to Nauwalde: Nieska, Schweinfurth and Spansberg.

References 

Meissen (district)
Former municipalities in Saxony